Dmitry Mulkevich (born 26 July 1996) is a Belarusian professional footballer who plays for Malorita.

References

External links 
 
 
 Profile at Dinamo Brest website

1996 births
Living people
Belarusian footballers
Association football midfielders
FC Dynamo Brest players
FC Kobrin players
FC Granit Mikashevichi players
FC Rukh Brest players
FC Volna Pinsk players
Sportspeople from Brest, Belarus